José Dolores Larreynaga Ayala (5 December 1828 – 29 June 1894) was a Salvadoran politician who served as President of the Legislative Assembly of El Salvador from 1872 to 1873 and again in 1888.

Biography 

José Dolores Larreynaga Ayala was born on 5 December 1828 in Sensuntepeque, then in the Federal Republic of Central America. His father was Felipe Larreynaga and his mother was Francisca Ayala. 

He served as President of the Legislative Assembly of El Salvador from 25 September 1872 to 18 October 1873. He served again from 13 February 1888 to 7 April 1888.

He died on 29 June 1894.

References

Citations

Bibliography 

1828 births
1894 deaths
Presidents of the Legislative Assembly of El Salvador
Members of the Legislative Assembly of El Salvador